Mill Creek is a stream in Jackson County, Indiana, in the United States. It is a tributary to the White River.

Mill Creek was named from the mills built along its banks.

Mill Creek has a mean annual discharge of 324 cubic feet per second at Manhattan, Indiana (based on data from 1940 to 2003).

See also
List of rivers of Indiana

References

Rivers of Jackson County, Indiana
Rivers of Indiana